Kiselev is a rural locality (a khutor) in Volokonovsky District, Belgorod Oblast, Russia. The population was 31 as of 2010. There are 4 streets.

Geography 
Kiselev is located 34 km southwest of Volokonovka (the district's administrative centre) by road. Borisovka is the nearest rural locality.

References 

Rural localities in Volokonovsky District